The 1920 Williams Ephs football team represented Williams College as an independent during the 1920 college football season. Led by Joseph W. Brooks in his third and final season as head coach, the Ephs compiled a record of 5–3. Benny Boynton led Eastern scorers.

Schedule

References

Williams
Williams Ephs football seasons
Williams Ephs football